Ereme Abraham (born July 28, 1992), better known as Twyse is a Nigerian comedian and actor. He is best known for acting many roles in his comedy skits.

Early life and education
Twyse grew up in Ibadan and he hails from Edo State, Nigeria. Twyse was based in the United Kingdom for a while. In a video interview, Twyse specified that he was studying law for a short period of time before he gave it up.

Personal life and controversy
In 2016, there was a circulating story about Twyse wanting to commit suicide. Twyse began tweeting about his suicidal thoughts and fans, friends and family were very concerned. Actress Toyin Abraham along with other Nigerian celebrities began to share videos of him across multiple social media platforms. Apart from comedy, Twyse is also a singer. He records his song in his leisure time.

See also
 List of Nigerian comedians
List of Nigerian actors

References

1992 births
Nigerian male comedians
Living people
Male actors from Edo State
21st-century Nigerian male actors
Nigerian male film actors
Nigerian Internet celebrities
Nigerian male singers